Bombus ashtoni is a species of cuckoo bumblebee. This means that it parasitizes closely related species such as Bombus affinis,  Bombus terricola, and Bombus fervidus by residing in the nests of these bumblebees and tricking the bees into providing resources such as food for them.

References

Bumblebees
Insects described in 1864